The 1999 NFL draft was the procedure by which National Football League teams selected amateur college football players. It is officially known as the NFL Annual Player Selection Meeting. The draft was held April 17–18, 1999, at the Theater at Madison Square Garden in New York City, New York. The league also held a supplemental draft after the regular draft and before the regular season.

Five quarterbacks were selected in the first round — Tim Couch, Donovan McNabb, Akili Smith, Daunte Culpepper, and Cade McNown — the second most (along with the 2018 and 2021 drafts) after the 1983 NFL Draft. The draft also marked the second time after 1971 that the first three selections (Couch, McNabb, and Smith) were quarterbacks. Only McNabb and Culpepper would have successful careers, while Couch, Smith, and McNown are generally regarded as draft busts. McNabb, the most successful of the five, was also the only to appear in a Super Bowl.

In addition to the quarterback selections, the draft is known for the Ricky Williams trade, which saw the New Orleans Saints trade all six of their draft picks to the Washington Redskins to select running back Ricky Williams fifth overall. New Orleans finished with a 3–13 record following the trade and Williams struggled as a rookie, resulting in the firing of Saints head coach Mike Ditka and general manager Bill Kuharich.

The following is the breakdown of the 253 players selected by position:

Player selections

Notable undrafted players

Trades
In the explanations below, (PD) indicates trades completed prior to the start of the draft (i.e. Pre-Draft), while (D) denotes trades that took place during the 1999 draft.

Round one

Round two

Round three

Round four

Round five

Round six

Round seven

Forfeited picks
Two selections in the 1999 draft were forfeited:

Supplemental draft
A supplemental draft was held in the summer of 1999. For each player selected in the supplemental draft, the team forfeits its pick in that round in the draft of the following season. The New England Patriots were the only team to select a player, selecting cornerback J'Juan Cherry from Arizona State in the 4th round.

Hall of Famers

 Champ Bailey, cornerback from Georgia taken 1st round 7th overall by the Washington Redskins.
Inducted: Pro Football Hall of Fame Class of 2019.

 Edgerrin James, running back from Miami (FL) taken 1st round 4th overall by the Indianapolis Colts.
Inducted: Pro Football Hall of Fame Class of 2020.

References
Trade references

General references

Notes

External links
 1999 NFL draft
 NFL.com – 1999 Draft 
 databaseFootball.com – 1999 Draft
 Pro Football Hall of Fame

National Football League Draft
NFL Draft
Draft
Madison Square Garden
NFL Draft
NFL Draft
American football in New York City
1990s in Manhattan
Sporting events in New York City